The New Hampton Historic District is a historic district in the village of New Hampton, Lebanon Township, Hunterdon County, New Jersey. It includes 42 contributing buildings, six contributing sites, and four contributing structures located along Musconetcong River Road.

The district includes the New Hampton Pony Pratt Truss Bridge across the Musconetcong River connecting Shoddy Mill Road in New Hampton with Rymon Road in Washington Township, Warren County.

History
By 1784, Henry Dusenbery (1760–1825) was working in the village as a merchant, operating the storehouse now at 47 Musconetcong River Road.

Gallery of contributing properties

References

Lebanon Township, New Jersey
National Register of Historic Places in Hunterdon County, New Jersey
Historic districts on the National Register of Historic Places in New Jersey
New Jersey Register of Historic Places
Georgian architecture in New Jersey